William Kashtan (27 June 1909 – 1993) was the general secretary of the Communist Party of Canada for 23 years beginning in January 1965, several months following the death of Leslie Morris, until his retirement in 1988. The delay in his assuming of the position was due to the opposition of Tim Buck to his appointment.

Kashtan was born in Montreal, Quebec in 1909. In 1927, at the age of 18, he joined the Young Communist League. Two years later, he moved to southern Ontario to organize for the YCL there and then became the League's general secretary in 1930. In 1936, he helped found the Canadian Youth Congress which, at its peak, had over 400,000 members.

He visited Spain early in the Spanish Civil War and on his return helped organize the Mackenzie–Papineau Battalion.

After World War II he served as Toronto organizer of the Labor-Progressive Party, as the Communist Party was known from 1943 to 1959, and served subsequently as industrial director, labour secretary and central organizer.  
 
He was a perennial candidate for the Labor-Progressive Party and then the Communist Party of Canada and became general secretary of the party in 1965, despite the opposition of party chairman and longtime leader Tim Buck.

Kashtan never succeeded in winning election to the House of Commons of Canada, and retired in 1988. He was an orthodox, pro-Moscow Communist and consistently supported the Soviet Union through various shifts in policy at the Kremlin. Kashtan opposed Eurocommunism in the 1970s when many other Communist Parties in the west embraced it.

In 1970, Kashtan spoke out against the Front de libération du Québec (FLQ) group in Quebec, describing it as a terrorist organization and claiming that its methods were not consistent with genuine revolutionary behaviour.

In 1971, on behalf of the CPC, he suggested James Gareth Endicott resign as president of the Canadian Peace Congress because he had drawn anti-Soviet and pro-China views, to which Endicott consented.

Kashtan retired as party leader in 1988 and was replaced by George Hewison. In the early 1990s, following the dissolution of the Soviet Union, Hewison and his supporters attempted to move the Communist Party away from Marxism-Leninism and towards social democracy in light of the failure of Soviet-style Communism. Kashtan came out of retirement to fight the changes, along with future Party leader and then member of the Central Executive, Elizabeth Rowley.

His views on the Soviet-Afghan war can be summarized in his 1980 speech at University of Alberta:The Soviet Union's involvement Afghanistan was not an act of aggression or intervention ... Rather, the Soviet Union was honoring a 1978 treaty with Afghanistan, which stipulated that Afghanistan could ask the U.S.S.R. for military aid ... He cited resistance to the revolution by the land-owning and capitalist classes as an internal factor. And continuing interference in the affairs of Afghanistan by Cpina [recte China], Pakistan, as well as the CIA, is an external reason mentioned by Kashtan.

Electoral record

References

1909 births
1993 deaths
Politicians from Montreal
Leaders of the Communist Party of Canada
Labor-Progressive Party candidates in the 1945 Canadian federal election
Labor-Progressive Party candidates in the 1953 Canadian federal election
Communist Party of Canada candidates in the 1965 Canadian federal election
Communist Party of Canada candidates in the 1968 Canadian federal election
Communist Party of Canada candidates in the 1974 Canadian federal election
Communist Party of Canada candidates in the 1979 Canadian federal election
Communist Party of Canada candidates in the 1980 Canadian federal election
Communist Party of Canada candidates in the 1984 Canadian federal election
Jewish socialists
Jewish Canadian politicians